Hangum  is a village development committee in Panchthar District in the Province No. 1 of eastern Nepal. At the time of the 1991 Nepal census it had a population of 2925 people living in 526 individual households.

Aarubote VDC in to the east, Mouwa VDC and Olane VDC in the north, Limba and Durdimba in the South respectively.

References

Populated places in Panchthar District